The 1955 Arizona State Sun Devils football team was an American football team that represented Arizona State College (later renamed Arizona State University) in the Border Conference during the 1955 college football season. In their first season under head coach Dan Devine, the Sun Devils compiled an 8–2–1 record (4–1 against Border opponents) and outscored their opponents by a combined total of 343 to 107.

Schedule

Roster
HB Bobby Mulgado

References

Arizona State
Arizona State Sun Devils football seasons
Arizona State Sun Devils football